Mislinja may refer to:
 Mislinja (settlement), a settlement in northern Slovenia, the seat of the Municipality of Mislinja
 Municipality of Mislinja, a municipality in northern Slovenia
 Mislinja (river), a river in northern Slovenia